Prosopidicola is a monotypic genus of fungi within the family Cryphonectriaceae containing the sole species Prosopidicola mexicana.

External links

Diaporthales
Monotypic Sordariomycetes genera